Camp Stanley is a U.S. Army facility located at the Leon Springs Military Reservation, the present day Camp Bullis, twenty miles northwest of downtown San Antonio near Fair Oaks Ranch, Texas. It operates the "Camp Stanley Storage Activity" (CSSA) as an ammunitions depot subpost of the San Antonio Arsenal. It is not to be confused with the U.S. Army's Camp Stanley located in South Korea.

History

Camp Stanley (Texas) was originally an infantry cantonment called Camp Funston (not to be confused with the U.S. Army's other Camp Funston, located in Kansas), and was renamed Camp Stanley on October 2, 1917, for Brig. Gen. David Sloane Stanley.
The primary missions of the "Camp Stanley Storage Activity" (CSSA) have been receipt, storage, and issuance of ordnance material; and quality assurance testing of military weapons and ammunition. The secondary mission of the CSSA is weapons training and qualifying.

Land transfers
After World War II, several land transfers occurred: In 1953 about 2,040 acres, the majority of the outer cantonment of present-day Camp Stanley, were transferred from Camp Bullis to the Camp Stanley Storage Activity (CSSA).  In 1949 CSSA had become assigned to the Red River (Arsenal) Army Depot near Texarkana, Texas, as a support facility. In 1970 an additional 204 acres were transferred to Camp Stanley. According to a US Army document of 2005, "The primary mission of CSSA is receipt, storage, and issuance of ordnance material as well as quality assurance testing of military weapons and ammunition. A secondary mission, weapons training and qualifying also occurs at CSSA."

CIA  presence
A 2010 solicitation for bids to do environmental work at Camp Stanley noted, "The installation stores large quantities of arms and ammunition and has sensitive missions, thus access to the installation and security clearance requirements for long-term personnel are much more restrictive than most military installations."  News stories in 2011  indicated a Central Intelligence Agency presence at Camp Stanley, possibly in connection with warehousing of ex-Soviet weapons for distribution to factions in conflicts the US wished to support covertly and deniably.

In December 2013, the CSSA was identified by former CIA analyst Allen Thomson as the probable site of a CIA arms cache known as the “Midwest Depot”, used from at least the early 1960s and probably through 2010. This would have Camp Stanley playing a role in some of the C.I.A.’s most storied operations.

References 

 Texas State Historical Association. "CAMP STANLEY". Texas State Historical Association, Denton, Texas. Retrieved on 05 May 2014.
 Thomson, Allen. "The U.S. Army Camp Stanley Storage Activity and The CIA Midwest Depot", Federation of American Scientists, Washington, D.C., updated 2015-08-06. 92pp, Retrieved on 20 September 2015.
 Briscoe, Edward Eugene. "Pershing's Chinese Refugees in Texas," Southwestern Historical Quarterly 62 (April 1959).
 Johnston, Leah Carter. San Antonio: St. Anthony's Town (San Antonio: Librarians Council, 1947).
 Miller, Ray. Ray Miller's Texas Forts (Houston: Cordovan, 1985). San Antonio Express Magazine, May 7, 1950.
 Texas Monthly Review, November 1917.
 Savage, Charlie. "Arms Cache Most Likely Kept in Texas by the C.I.A.", The New York Times, 4 May 2014, Retrieved on 5 May 2014.

Installations of the United States Army
Military facilities in Texas